The Collaboration is an upcoming film directed by Kwame Kwei-Armah on his feature film debut, scripted by Anthony McCarten adapted from his own stage play of the same name. The film will feature Paul Bettany and Jeremy Pope reprising the roles of Andy Warhol and Jean-Michel Basquiat which they performed in the original run of the stage play in February 2022 in London's West End, and for an extended run on Broadway into February 2023.

Plot
Two contrasting artists, Andy Warhol and Jean-Michel Basquiat, begin a successful collaboration in 1980s New York after being paired by art collector Bruno Bischofberger.

Cast
Paul Bettany as Andy Warhol
Jeremy Pope as Jean-Michel Basquiat
Daniel Brühl as Bruno Bischofberger
Melissa Barrera as Maya
Henry Hunter Hall as Michael Stewart
Andrea Sooch as Julia Warhol 
Andrew Fama as Jed
Erin Eva Butcher as Pat Hackett
Charlie Statires as Peter

Production
In February 2022 it was announced that Anthony McCarten had adapted his stage play and would produce a film version alongside Denis O’Sullivan with Kwame Kwei-Armah directing. Paul Bettany and Jeremy Pope would reprise their roles from the original run of the stage play as Andy Warhol and Jean-Michel Basquiat, respectively. In August 2022 Daniel Brühl was added to the cast, while Hannah Beachler would serve as production designer and Robert Yeoman as cinematographer. In September 2022 Melissa Barrera was revealed to be joining the cast, while Paul Machliss would edit the film. Filming started in 2022 in the Greater Boston area with scenes filmed in the Marina Studios in Quincy, Massachusetts from 14 September 2022 and parts of Lynn, Massachusetts doubling up as 1980s New York.

Release
Bettany told the Observer in late 2022 that the film hadn’t been edited at that point, with an earliest release date of late summer 2023, perhaps in Venice - but without firm plans.

References

External links

 

Films about artists
Biographical films about artists
Biographical films about painters
Cultural depictions of Andy Warhol
American films based on actual events
American biographical drama films
Cultural depictions of 20th-century painters
Films set in Manhattan
Films set in the 1980s
Jean-Michel Basquiat
Upcoming films
Upcoming directorial debut films
Upcoming English-language films